Keenan Prochnow (born December 31, 1997) is an American pair skater. With his former skating partner, Laiken Lockley, he is the 2019 U.S. national junior champion. The pair placed within the top six at the 2019 World Junior Championships.

Personal life 
Prochnow was born on December 31, 1997, in Highland Park, Illinois. He graduated from Indiana University High School in 2016.

Career 
Prochnow began learning to skate in 2004. He competed with Sophia Pearson for three seasons. The two won bronze in intermediate pairs at the 2014 U.S. Championships.

Prochnow teamed up with Laiken Lockley in April 2015. During their first season together, the pair competed in the novice ranks, placing fifth at the 2016 U.S. Championships.

Lockley/Prochnow debuted on the ISU Junior Grand Prix series in October 2016. They took bronze in the junior pairs' category at the 2018 U.S. Championships. In April 2018, Lockley fractured a bone in her foot.

Lockley/Prochnow won the junior pairs' title at the 2019 U.S. Championships. They placed fifth in the short program, sixth in the free skate, and sixth overall at the 2019 World Junior Championships in Zagreb, Croatia.

Programs 
(with Lockley)

Competitive highlights 
JGP: Junior Grand Prix

Pairs with Lockley

Pairs with Pearson

Men's singles

References

External links 
 

1997 births
American male pair skaters
Living people
People from Highland Park, Illinois